Mandla is a city and municipality in Madhya Pradesh, India. Mandla may also refer to
Mandla (name)
Mandla district in Madhya Pradesh, India 
Mandla Fort railway station in Mandla district 
Mandla Plant Fossils National Park in Mandla district 
Mandla (Lok Sabha constituency) in Madhya Pradesh, India
Mandla v Dowell-Lee, a 1983 United Kingdom law case on racial discrimination